Day of Sun and Rain is a 1967 Soviet family film directed by Viktor Sokolov.

Plot 
The film tells about the 7th grade students Kolya and Alyosha, who do not like each other. And suddenly they decide to run away from their lessons and spend the whole day together, which changed their attitude both towards each other and towards the world around them...

Cast 
 Aleksandr Barinov as Aleksey (as Sasha Barinov)
 Anatoliy Popov as Nikolai (as Tolya Popov)
 Aleksandr Sokolov as Aleksei's Father
 Yelizaveta Time as Actress (as Yelizaveta Time-Kachalova)
 Svetlana Savyolova as Aleksei's Sister
 Mikhail Kozakov
 Tatyana Piletskaya
 Aleksey Petrenko

References

External links 
 

1967 films
1960s Russian-language films
Soviet teen films